Owentown is an unincorporated community in Smith County, located in the U.S. state of Texas. The former Camp Fannin area was purchased by the Owen Development Company and became known as Owentown.

Notes
Five 1958 aerial photographs are in the Cotton Belt Public Relations photos showing Owentown.

Unincorporated communities in Smith County, Texas
Unincorporated communities in Texas